Nogometni klub Ilirska Bistrica, commonly referred to as NK Ilirska Bistrica or simply Ilirska Bistrica, is a Slovenian football club from Ilirska Bistrica. The team competes in the Littoral League, the fourth tier of Slovenian football. The club was founded in 1926.

Honours
Littoral League (fourth tier)
 Winners: 1994–95, 2010–11

MNZ Koper Cup
 Winners: 2010–11

References

Association football clubs established in 1926
Municipality of Ilirska Bistrica
Football clubs in Slovenia
1926 establishments in Slovenia